Moses Meninga (born 6 June 1993) is a Papua New Guinean professional rugby league footballer who plays  for the Townsville Blackhawks in the Queensland Cup. He represented the Papua New Guinea national team at the 2017 World Cup.

Biography
Meninga was born in Mount Hagen, Papua New Guinea. His family name was traditionally spelled Mennga. He played his junior rugby league for the Solo Eels.

References

External links
2017 RLWC profile
 http://www.looppng.com/sport/marum-makes-changes-usa-clash-69179

1993 births
Living people
Papua New Guinean rugby league players
Papua New Guinea Hunters players
People from the Western Highlands Province
Rugby league props
Rugby league locks